Darryl Pierce de la Harpe (born 10 February 1986) is a Namibian rugby union player. He was named in Namibia's squad for the 2015 Rugby World Cup.

References

1986 births
Living people
Namibian rugby union players
Namibia international rugby union players
Place of birth missing (living people)
People educated at Windhoek High School
Rugby union centres
Falcons (rugby union) players
Welwitschias players
RCJ Farul Constanța players
Leeds Tykes players